The 123rd Infantry Division (123. Infanterie-Division) was a formation of the Imperial German Army in World War I. The division was formed on April 1, 1915, and organized over the next several weeks. It was part of a wave of new infantry divisions formed in the spring of 1915. The division was disbanded in 1919 during the demobilization of the German Army after World War I.

The division was a Royal Saxon division, made up of troops from that kingdom. It was formed primarily from the excess infantry regiments of regular infantry divisions which were being triangularized. The division's 245th Infantry Brigade was the former 64th Infantry Brigade of the 32nd (3rd Royal Saxon) Infantry Division, and came to the division with the 178th Infantry Regiment. The 106th Reserve Infantry Regiment came from the 24th (2nd Royal Saxon) Reserve Division and the 182nd Infantry Regiment came from the 23rd (1st Royal Saxon) Infantry Division.

Combat chronicle

The 123rd Infantry Division initially fought on the Western Front in World War I, entering the line in the Aisne region in mid-April 1915. Later in 1915, it fought in the Battle of Loos. It remained on the front in the Flanders and Artois regions into 1916, and in July entered the Battle of the Somme, where it reportedly lost 6,000 men. It was transferred to the Eastern Front at the end of the month, where it went into the line near Lake Narač until November 1917, when it returned to the Western Front. It went into the line near Verdun until May 1918. It later fought in the Second Battle of the Marne and then returned to the line near Verdun. Late in 1918, it faced the Allied Meuse-Argonne Offensive. It remained in the line until the end of the war. Allied intelligence rated the division as third class and of mediocre combat value.

Order of battle on formation

The 123rd Infantry Division was formed as a triangular division. The order of battle of the division on April 1, 1915, was as follows:

245. Infanterie-Brigade
Kgl. Sächsisches Reserve-Infanterie-Regiment Nr. 106
Kgl. Sächsisches 13. Infanterie-Regiment Nr. 178
Kgl. Sächsisches 16. Infanterie-Regiment Nr. 182
1. Eskadron/Kgl. Sächsisches 1. Husaren-Regiment "König Albert" Nr. 18
5. Eskadron/Kgl. Sächsisches 3. Husaren-Regiment Nr. 20
Kgl. Sächsisches Feldartillerie-Regiment Nr. 245
Fußartillerie-Batterie Nr. 123
Kgl. Sächsische Pionier-Kompanie Nr. 245

Late-war order of battle

The division underwent relatively few organizational changes over the course of the war. The 182nd Infantry Regiment was sent to the newly formed 212th Infantry Division in 1916 and was replaced by the 425th Infantry Regiment, which was in turn replaced by the 351st Infantry Regiment. Cavalry was reduced, artillery and signals commands were formed, and combat engineer support was expanded to a full pioneer battalion. The order of battle on June 3, 1918, was as follows:

245. Infanterie-Brigade
Kgl. Sächsisches Reserve-Infanterie-Regiment Nr. 106
Kgl. Sächsisches 13. Infanterie-Regiment Nr. 178
Kgl. Sächsisches Infanterie-Regiment Nr. 351
5.Eskadron/Kgl. Sächsisches 3. Husaren-Regiment Nr. 20
Kgl. Sächsischer Artillerie-Kommandeur 123
Kgl. Sächsisches Feldartillerie-Regiment Nr. 245
Fußartillerie-Bataillon Nr. 137
Kgl. Sächsisches Pionier-Bataillon Nr. 123
Pionier-Kompanie Nr. 123
Pionier-Kompanie Nr. 245
Minenwerfer-Kompanie Nr. 123
Kgl. Sächsischer Divisions-Nachrichten-Kommandeur 123

References

Citations

Bibliography 

 123. Infanterie-Division (Chronik 1915/1918) - Der erste Weltkrieg
 Hermann Cron et al., Ruhmeshalle unserer alten Armee (Berlin, 1935)
 Hermann Cron, Geschichte des deutschen Heeres im Weltkriege 1914-1918 (Berlin, 1937)
 Günter Wegner, Stellenbesetzung der deutschen Heere 1825-1939. (Biblio Verlag, Osnabrück, 1993), Bd. 1
 Histories of Two Hundred and Fifty-One Divisions of the German Army which Participated in the War (1914-1918), compiled from records of Intelligence section of the General Staff, American Expeditionary Forces, at General Headquarters, Chaumont, France 1919 (1920)

Infantry divisions of Germany in World War I
Military units and formations established in 1915
Military units and formations disestablished in 1919
1915 establishments in Germany